Aspicarpa is a genus of flowering plants belonging to the family Malpighiaceae.

Its native range is Subtropical America.

Species:

Aspicarpa boliviensis 
Aspicarpa brevipes 
Aspicarpa harleyi 
Aspicarpa hirtella 
Aspicarpa hyssopifolia 
Aspicarpa pulchella 
Aspicarpa salicifolia 
Aspicarpa schininii 
Aspicarpa sericea 
Aspicarpa steinmannii 
Aspicarpa uruguariensis

References

Malpighiaceae
Malpighiaceae genera